Marsel Alexander Kararbo (born 1 October 1994) is an Indonesian professional footballer who plays for Liga 2 club Kalteng Putra as a left winger.

Club career

Persipura Jayapura
In 2018, Kararbo signed a contract with Indonesian Liga 1 club Persipura Jayapura. He made his league debut on 7 April 2018 in a match against PS TIRA at the Mandala Stadium, Jayapura.

Persela Lamongan
He was signed for Persela Lamongan to play in Liga 1 in the 2019 season. Kararbo made his league debut on 17 May 2019 in a match against Madura United at the Surajaya Stadium, Lamongan.

Persewar Waropen
Kararbo joined the Persewar Waropen club in the 2020 Liga 2. This season was suspended on 27 March 2020 due to the COVID-19 pandemic. The season was abandoned and was declared void on 20 January 2021.

References

External links 
 Marsel Kararbo at Soccerway
 Marsel Kararbo at Liga Indonesia

1994 births
Living people
Indonesian footballers
Liga 1 (Indonesia) players
Liga 2 (Indonesia) players
Persewangi Banyuwangi players
Persipura Jayapura players
Persela Lamongan players
Persewar Waropen players
Association football midfielders